Rachel's malimbe (Malimbus racheliae) is a species of bird in the family Ploceidae.
It is found in Cameroon, Equatorial Guinea, Gabon, and Nigeria.
It is also known under the name Rachel's weaver. Its habitat is restricted to the lowland forests of the area surrounding the Gulf of Guinea.

The nest is built by three to four birds of which only one is female and which takes the leading role in building the nest. After the nest is finished, one of the males that participated in the building chases off the other participating males. Both of the remaining couple take duty of incubating the eggs.

References

External links
 Rachel's malimbe -  Species text in Weaver Watch.

Rachel's malimbe
Birds of Central Africa
Rachel's malimbe
Taxonomy articles created by Polbot